Physoschistura is a genus of fish in the family Nemacheilidae found mostly in Southeast Asia.

Species
There are currently 12 recognized species in this genus:
 Physoschistura brunneana (Annandale, 1918)
 Physoschistura chhimtuipuiensis Lalramliana, Lalhlimpuia, Solo & Vanramliana, 2016 
 Physoschistura chindwinensis Lokeshwor & Vishwanath, 2012 
 Physoschistura chulabhornae Suvarnaraksha, 2013 
 Physoschistura dikrongensis Lokeshwor & Vishwanath, 2012 
 Physoschistura elongata N. Sen & Nalbant, 1982
 Physoschistura pseudobrunneana Kottelat, 1990
 Physoschistura raoi (Hora, 1929)
 Physoschistura rivulicola (Hora, 1929)
 Physoschistura shanensis (Hora, 1929)
 Physoschistura tigrinum Lokeshwor & Vishwanath, 2012 
 Physoschistura tuivaiensis Lokeshwor, Vishwanath & Shanta, 2012

References

Nemacheilidae
Fish of Asia
Taxa named by Petre Mihai Bănărescu
Taxa named by Teodor T. Nalbant